The Service Portfolio is described in the ITIL books Service Strategy and Service Design.  The Service Portfolio is the core repository for all information for all services in an organization. Each service is listed along with its current status and history. The main descriptor in the Service Portfolio is the  Service Design Package (SDP).

The Service Portfolio consists of three parts:
 Service Pipeline
This contains references to services that are not yet live. They may be proposed, or under development. Those might be new services or modifications in the existing ones, coming from the Strategy phase and ready for the Operation phase.
 Service Catalogue
This contains links to active services through their Service Design Package
 Retired Services
Services in the process of being discontinued, before they are finally decommissioned

Of these three, only the Service Catalogue is visible to the customers and support team. Customers are excluded from the pipeline provisioning process for services under development.

See also
 Application Services Library – A similar framework for Application Management
 Business Information Services Library (BiSL) – A similar framework for Information Management and Functional Management
 Granular configuration automation
 ITIL The Service Management Framework
 Service Design Package SDP
 ISO/IEC 20000 – An international standard for IT service management
 Tudor IT Process Assessment – An framework for assessment of IT service management maturity
 Performance engineering
 RPR problem diagnosis

References

Bibliography 
 

ITIL
IT service management